Tredavoe is a hamlet west of Newlyn in Cornwall, England, United Kingdom.

References

External links

Hamlets in Cornwall